The 165th Street Bus Terminal, also known as Jamaica Bus Terminal, the Long Island Bus Terminal (the name emblazoned on the entranceway's red tiles), Jamaica−165th Street Terminal (as signed on buses towards the terminal), or simply 165th Street Terminal,  is a major bus terminal in Jamaica, Queens. Owned by MTA Regional Bus Operations, the terminal serves both NYCT and MTA Bus lines as well as NICE Bus lines to Nassau County, and was a hub to Green Bus Lines prior to MTA takeover. It is located at 89th Avenue and Merrick Boulevard, near the Queens Public Library's main branch. Most buses that pass through Jamaica serve either this terminal, the Jamaica Center subway station at Parsons Boulevard, or the LIRR station at Sutphin Boulevard.

Unlike other major bus centers in New York City, there is currently no direct subway transfer available at the terminal.

History

Construction on the "Long Island Bus Terminal" began in 1930, built by the Shore Road Development Company, Inc. with the intent of expanding transit service to and from Long Island. On August 11, 1936, Bee-Line, Inc. (one of the predecessors to the Nassau Inter-County Express) opened the terminal, operating routes from the terminal to the rest of Jamaica and Southeast Queens, and to Nassau County. It replaced the company's former terminal − the Jamaica Union Bus Terminal − at Jamaica Avenue and New York Boulevard (now Guy R. Brewer Boulevard), which was taken over by Green Bus Lines. The new terminal, which cost $1.5 million to build, featured a waiting room, lounge, and ticket offices. The bus terminal was enclosed by two one-story buildings on 165th Street and Merrick Boulevard respectively. Upon opening, the terminal served the BMT Jamaica Line's nearby terminal at 168th Street and Jamaica Avenue, and would serve the IND Queens Boulevard Line's 169th Street station on Hillside Avenue upon its completion in 1937. In May 1939, Bee-Line relinquished its Queens routes; these routes began operation from the terminal under North Shore Bus Company (a predecessor to the NYCT bus operations) on June 25, 1939.

In March 1947, North Shore Bus would be taken over by the New York City Board of Transportation, making the bus routes from the terminal city operated. In 1952, the terminal was purchased by the Jamaica Realty Corporation, and in 1953 the New York City Transit Authority (today part of the MTA) took over operations of the terminal from the Board of Transportation. The terminal would later be served by the Green Bus Lines company (predecessor to the JFK Depot-based MTA Bus Company lines). Following the closure of the 168th Street station in 1977, the bus terminal lost its only direct subway connection.

As originally built, the terminal had only one entry point, on its north side from 89th Avenue. At some point, the structure on Merrick Boulevard was removed, allowing buses to turn directly onto the street or into the terminal.

List of routes

The terminal serves seven routes operated by MTA New York City Bus, four operated by MTA Bus Company, and six operated by Nassau Inter-County Express (NICE; formerly MTA Long Island Bus). All terminate here, except for the Q17, which is a through route. The southbound Q17 bus stops outside the terminal on Merrick Boulevard, while the northbound Q17 to Flushing stops on 168th Street, one block east.

165th Street Mall

Adjacent to the bus terminal is the 165th Street Mall, a pedestrian shopping mall running the entire length of 165th Street between 89th Avenue and Jamaica Avenue. Within the block are over 160 stores, including several apparel and footwear stores and a food court. The strip on 165th Street was originally constructed as part of the terminal, opening just after the terminal debuted in 1936. Shops were also built on 166th Street (today's Merrick Boulevard), but are not present today. In 1943 a massive fire damaged eleven stores along the strip, and a four-alarm fire in 1959 destroyed six shops and caused over $1 million in damage.

From 1947 to 1979, the mall housed a large Macy's location constructed by Robert D. Kohn, one of the department chain's first locations in Queens. The Macy's closed due to several issues, including the threat of burglary, the transition of Jamaica from a middle-class White neighborhood to a working class Black and immigrant neighborhood, and the closure and demolition of the BMT Jamaica Avenue El east of 121st Street that led many other businesses in the area to suffer.

In May 1979, 165th Street was redeveloped as a pedestrian mall, with the street closed to vehicular traffic and repaved with red brick. In May 1983, a third fire occurred damaging 12 stores.

One of the primary attractions of the mall today is the Jamaica Colosseum Mall, which took over the former Macy's building in 1984. The Colosseum is one of New York City's largest jewelry exchanges. It has over 120 merchants and jewelers, a rooftop parking lot, and houses the 165th Street Mall's food court. Several New York rappers including Jamaica native 50 Cent shopped in the Colosseum growing up, and music videos have been filmed at the facility.

Following the opening of the Archer Avenue Lines in 1988, merchants from the mall sued the NYCT due to the loss of business after the diversion of several bus lines to the new subway stations. The NYCT proceeded to extend the Q76 and Q77 from the 179th Street station, while Green Bus Lines added five bus routes to the terminal.

Nearby points of interest
One block west of the terminal on 164th Street is the First Presbyterian Church, built in 1662. The Jamaica Main Post Office is located one block north of the church at 89th Avenue and 164th Street. The Queens Central Library and the Children's Library Discovery Center are located directly across Merrick Boulevard, as is the former Loew's Valencia Theatre (now the Tabernacle of Prayer Church) one block south. On the southeast corner of 165th Street and Jamaica Avenue, across from the mall, is the former control tower of the 168th Street station, rented by retail shops since the 1930s.

See also
List of bus routes in Queens
List of bus routes in Nassau County, New York
Fulton Mall
Port Authority Bus Terminal
George Washington Bridge Bus Terminal
Rosa Parks Hempstead Transit Center
Mineola Intermodal Center

References

External links

MTA Regional Bus Operations
Bus stations in New York City
Transportation buildings and structures in Queens, New York
Bus transportation in New York City
Jamaica, Queens
1936 establishments in New York City